Tomasz Karol Kędziora (born 11 June 1994) is a Polish professional footballer who plays as a defender for Super League Greece club PAOK, on loan from Dynamo Kyiv, and the Poland national team.

Club career

Early career
At the age of four, Tomasz Karol Kędziora started attending the youth academy of the UKP Zielona Góra. He was being trained at the time by his father, Mirosław. In 2000 he officially started training with players his age.

In July 2010, he took part as an UKP Zielona Góra player in the final tournament of the Polish Junior Championships. The team won the bronze medal, coached by Tomasz Kędziora's father.

Lech Poznań
Before the start of the 2010–11 season, Kędziora signed for reigning Polish champions Lech Poznań. Initially he was a player of the Junior Ekstraklasa Lech team, where in the 2010–11 season  he played 20 matches and scored two goals. In the fall of the 2011–12 season, he was placed in the first team, but continued to perform only in the Junior Ekstraklasa, having 20 appearances and scoring seven goals (including five from penalties).

On 20 September 2011, Kędziora was included in Lech's squad for the 1/16 Polish Cup final against Chrobry Głogów, but he did not play. On 21 June 2012, Kędziora signed a new three-year contract with the Poznań club, which went until 30 June 2015.

Kędziora made his debut for the first team on 12 July 2012 in a 1–1 draw of the first qualifying round of the Europa League with Kazakhstan club FC Zhetysu, entering at the 90th minute for Bartosz Ślusarski.

On 27 October 2012, Kędziora made his debut in the Ekstraklasa in the 2–0 defeat against Jagiellonia Białystok in the 9th round, replacing Hubert Wołąkiewicz in the 62nd minute. On 20 September 2013, during the 8th round of the Ekstraklasa with Pogoń Szczecin, he suffered an injury to his thigh muscle and returned on 13 December for the 21st match against Zawisza Bydgoszcz. On 5 May 2014, he scored his first goal in the Polish top-flight in a 2–1 win in the 32nd round against Zawisza Bydgoszcz.

Kędziora signed a new, three-year contract with the Poznań club on 1 November 2015, effective from 1 July 2015 to 30 June 2018. In the 2014–15 season, he won the Polish title with the team, appearing in 35 matches, scoring three goals and having six assists.

Dynamo Kyiv
On 11 July 2017, Kędziora signed a 4-year contract with Ukrainian club Dynamo Kyiv.

Return to Lech Poznań
On 7 March 2022, FIFA announced that, due to the Russian invasion of Ukraine, all the contracts of foreign players in Ukraine are suspended until 30 June 2022 and they are allowed to sign with clubs outside Ukraine until 30 June 2022, and the transfer window is reopened for such players to sign and get registered for the new club until 7 April 2022. On 17 March 2022, Kędziora returned to Lech Poznań until the end of the season under that condition.

Loan to PAOK
On 29 January 2023, Kędziora joined with Greek club PAOK on loan from Dynamo Kyiv.

International career
Kędziora got his first call up to the senior Poland squad for friendlies against Georgia and Greece in June 2015. But he made his debut against Mexico on 13 November 2017.

In May 2018, he was named in Poland’s preliminary 35-man squad for the 2018 World Cup in Russia. However, he did not make the final 23.

Career statistics

Club

International

Scores and results list Poland's goal tally first, score column indicates score after each Kędziora goal.

Honours
Lech Poznań
 Ekstraklasa: 2014–15, 2021–22
 Polish Super Cup: 2015, 2016

Dynamo Kyiv
Ukrainian Premier League: 2020–21
Ukrainian Cup: 2019–20, 2020–21
Ukrainian Super Cup: 2018, 2019, 2020

References

External links
 

1994 births
Living people
People from Sulechów
Sportspeople from Lubusz Voivodeship
Polish footballers
Association football defenders
Poland international footballers
Poland youth international footballers
Poland under-21 international footballers
Ekstraklasa players
Ukrainian Premier League players
UEFA Euro 2020 players
Lech Poznań II players
Lech Poznań players
FC Dynamo Kyiv players
PAOK FC players
Polish expatriate footballers
Polish expatriate sportspeople in Ukraine
Expatriate footballers in Ukraine
Polish expatriate sportspeople in Greece
Expatriate footballers in Greece